Candi Dasa, or often Candidasa is a seaside town on the eastern cost of Bali that rests on the edge of a fresh water lagoon, named Candi Dasa Lagoon.  The town is centred around  Jalan Raya Candida, where a number of hotels, restaurants, and shops line the main road.  
It is popular tourist stop, attracting divers and those looking for a more sedate alternative to the busy, nightclub filled Kuta area or the large, manicured resorts at Nusa Dua.

History

Most sources say a fishing village was founded on the site by the 12th century and before the modern name of Candi Dasa was adopted it was known as both Teluk Kehen ("Bay of Fire") and Cilidasa.
It is thought that the temple near the lagoon, with a statue of the fertility goddess Hariti surrounded by a group of children is the origin of the name cilidasa which translates from Balinese as "ten children". Many Balinese who want to have children go on pilgrimage to this temple to pray  The modern name is thought to be a corruption of this older name.

The town began to catch on as a tourist destination in the 1970s. The diving and snorkeling in the area brought many tourists and the village began to grow. Hotels, villas, and restaurants popped up along the main strip, and in more recent years, atms, health clinics, and mini marts are also found here. Apart from great diving and snorkeling, the town provides easy access to other destinations in eastern Bali.

Beach erosion
As tourism boomed in the 1970s and 1980s, Candidasa received a large amount of investment in tourism and a construction boom occurred. To fuel the construction of beach bungalows, new homes and restaurants, the offshore reef was mined for lime to make cement and other construction materials. This removed the coastal barrier that had protected the beach which was undermined and washed away.

During the 90's local hotel owners constructed a series of t-shaped groins jutting out into the water in an attempt to preserve the beach, with mixed results. However, with government programs to stop erosion and more awareness of the importance of the reefs, the beaches are now somewhat recovered.

Diving
Candidasa is a great spot for snorkeling and diving. There are three islands just of the coast: Gili Tepekong, Gili Mimpang and - a bit further north-east, Gili Biaha. All three offer excellent diving, especially for more experienced divers. Currents can be quite strong and surprising, but most of the dive centres in Candidasa have experienced dive instructors and guides to lead the way. Other dive sites include the Jetty (in between Candidasa and Padang Bai), which is a paradise for macro fans.

In the area
Candidasa is a great base for explorations in East Bali. Only about 15 minutes to the east is the Virgin Beach, one of the most beautiful and natural beaches in Bali. Also close by is the village of Tegunan Pegringsingan, one of the oldest villages in Bali. This is an interesting place to visit if you are interested in the history and unique culture of the area.

The large Lotus Lagoon on the main road in Candidasa is a favorite stop for photographs. At sunset it is especially pretty as a backdrop for some holiday snaps.

Gallery

References

External links

Populated places in Bali